Diego David Jiménez Martínez (born 29 May 1979 in Alcoy, Alcoià, Valencian Community) is a Spanish footballer who plays as a midfielder.

External links

1979 births
Living people
People from Alcoy
Sportspeople from the Province of Alicante
Spanish footballers
Footballers from the Valencian Community
Association football midfielders
Segunda División players
Segunda División B players
Tercera División players
CD Alcoyano footballers
UD Alzira footballers
Alicante CF footballers
Villajoyosa CF footballers
SD Eibar footballers
CD Olímpic de Xàtiva footballers